Here is the list of ESFA competitions in 2003–2004:

English Schools' Football Association
Schools